is a Japanese professional shogi player ranked 7-dan.

Early life
Yashiro was born on March 3, 1994, in Kamo District, Shizuoka. He learned how to play shogi from his father when he was a first-grade elementary school student, and was accepted into the Japan Shogi Association's apprentice school at the rank of 6-kyū in September 2005 under the guidance of shogi professional Teruichi Aono.

At first, Yashiro had some difficulty as an apprentice professional and even came close to being demoted in rank to 7-kyū; however, he started practicing regularly at the Kamata Shogi Cluba well-known shogi club where many strong amateurs, apprentence professionals, and even regular professionals would practiceand his results began to quickly improve. He was promoted to the rank of 1-dan in 2008, and then 3-dan in April 2010. He obtained full professional status and the rank of 4-dan in March 2012 after finishing runner up in the 50th 3-dan League (October 2011March 2012) with a record of 14 wins and 4 losses.

Shogi professional
Yashiro was just twenty-two years old at the time which made him the then youngest player to ever have won the tournament. Yashiro's record, however, was broken the following year by Sōta Fujii who won the 11th Asahi Cup Open as a fifteen-year-old.

Promotion history
The promotion history for Yashiro is as follows:
 6-kyū: September 2005
 3-dan: April 2010
 4-dan: April 1, 2012
 5-dan: May 12, 2015
 6-dan: February 11, 2017
 7-dan: April 23, 2019

Titles and other championships
Yashiro has yet to make an appearance in a major title match, but he has won one non-major shogi championships during his career.

Awards and honors
Yashiro received the Japan Shogi Association Annual Shogi Award for "Best New Player" for the 201617 Shogi Year.

References

External links
ShogiHub: Professional Player Info · Yashiro, Wataru

Japanese shogi players
Living people
Professional shogi players
Professional shogi players from Shizuoka Prefecture
1994 births